Radio Mindanao Network, Inc. (RMN), d.b.a. RMN Networks or RMN Network, is a Filipino media company based in Makati, Philippines. It is primarily involved is one of the largest radio networks. Its corporate office is located at the 4th Floor State Condominium I Bldg, Salcedo St., Legaspi Village, Makati, and its main headquarters are located at the RMN Broadcast Center (Canoy Bldg.), Don Apolinario Velez St., Cagayan de Oro. while the radio studios are located in Guadalupe, Makati and Greenhills, San Juan City.

The network's first radio station was DXCC (which also serves as the network's flagship station) established in Cagayan de Oro in Mindanao on August 28, 1952. The callsign has been supposed as a reference to the surnames of the business' founders (Canoy and Cui) but, according to founder Henry Canoy in his memoir, was actually chosen to mean Cagayan de Oro City.

History
Sometime in 1948, Don Henry R. Canoy, together with Robin Cui and Vicente Rivera, set up two home-built tube radio receivers bought from Fideng Palacio of Puntod and placed them in an abandoned chicken poultry house situated at the corner of Velez and del Pilar streets in Cagayan de Oro for the purpose of listening to radio broadcasts from Manila. Canoy and friends ended up listening to radio broadcasts at night when reception was better. Eventually, the friends were all convinced to build a radio transmitter of their own. The group managed to assemble a 30-Watt radio transmitter from surplus parts bought at Raon Street in Quiapo, Manila. Henry Canoy broke the airwaves as a Pirate radio station in 1949, declaring "This is Cagayan de Oro calling...". Because the broadcast was not authorized by the Radio Control Office (RCO), it did not contain call letters.

In 1950 Canoy, at the insistence of his brother, lawyer Reuben R. Canoy, decided to establish a more powerful radio station and applied for a congressional franchise in Manila to support its lawful operation. In 1951, he set up the fledgling station in partnership with Robin Cui, Max Suniel, Oscar Neri and Andres Bacal as equity partners with P10,000 in capital. on June 23, 1952, he was granted a permit to maintain and operate the radio broadcasting station.

Using the Radio Amateur's Handbook as their guide and also with surplus parts bought from Raon in Quiapo, Manila, they built their own 500-watt AM transmitter with the assistance from Far East Broadcasting Company engineers, American Dick Rowland and Byrd Bruneimer. The transmitter was transported to Mindanao aboard the boat MV Snug Hitch. With only a telescopic steel pole as antenna borrowed from the Bureau of Telecom, the improvised horizontal radio antenna was mounted by the team which include Ongkoy Padero, former vice president for engineering of CEPALCO, attaching one end of a copper wire to the pole and the other end to a 30 meters coconut tree a block away . While their first “transmitter building” was financed with a P5,000 “duck farm” loan from the Philippine National Bank. The Radio Control Office (RCO) headed by Mr Jose Viado, assigned the station a broadcast frequency of 1560 kHz.

On July 4, 1952, it finally went on air for a test broadcast, coinciding with the birthday of his mother. It officially started broadcasting on August 28, 1952, also coinciding with the town fiesta of San Agustin, the patron saint of Cagayan de Oro archdiocese. Listeners anticipated the first words they would hear on radio and were greeted the station ID and the following words: “You are tuned to Station DXCC, broadcasting with a power of 500 watts on 1560 kilocycles from Cagayan de Oro's Gateway to Mindanao!” and every hour thereafter. The stations first live broadcast coincides with its opening and the program involves the airing of a 3-hour “Anejo Rum” show from Plaza Divisoria, a central park in downtown Cagayan de Oro, for which Canoy billed La Tondena executive Hugo Chan Hong the sum of P500 as payment for the radio coverage. (RMN The Henry R. Canoy Story, ISBN ?, Copyright 1997)

In 1954, Henry R. Canoy visited the United States under an observation grant. Instead of going to the giant networks and other big cities, he opted to be taken to a small town of Greeley, Colorado, and he came upon a station that was doing exactly what DXCC was already trying to do in Mindanao. Its broadcast fare was peppered with farm prices, market and road conditions, weather warnings and personal messages. He came back with the blueprint for DXCC, which is entertainment, information and most of all education to the public.

The success of its broadcasting concept enabled DXCC to expand broadcast areas in 1953 stations to Iligan (DXIC), then to Butuan (DXBC) and Davao (DXDC) where born. By 1957, the station with a coconut tree for an antenna had given birth to four others. And so the string of community stations became Radio Mindanao Network (RMN).

In 1961, RMN's approach to broadcasting drew the interest of another visionary business leader, the late Andres Soriano Sr. of San Miguel Corporation who eventually bought the majority shares of RMN and brought the radio network to Manila, the first provincial station to do so. "The Sound of the City" concept was born with the establishment of DZHP in the Greater Manila Area. Its format was strictly music and news. RMN joined forces with the Philippine Herald and Inter-Island Broadcasting Corporation to form the powerful first tri-media organization. That association gave RMN at the forefront of broadcast journalism and public service. Other "Sound of the City" stations soon followed in Zamboanga in 1961 (DXRZ), Cebu in 1962 (DYHP), Metro Manila (DWXL) (now DZXL) and Iloilo in 1963 (DYRI), Bacolod in 1964 (DYHB), Tagbilaran in 1967 (DYXT), Baguio (DZHB) and Bislig, Surigao del Sur in 1968 (DXHP).

In 1968, RMN made a "first" in Philippine radio history by initiating the national newscasts via microwave. Fast, direct and crystal clear network newscasts emanating from the Tri-Media News Central in Manila brought the events as they happened in all parts of the country via stations DZHP in Manila, DZHB in Baguio, DYHP in Cebu, DXCC in Cagayan de Oro and DXDC in Davao.

From 1969 to 1970 three more community stations emerged - DXRS in Surigao and DZHN in Naga and in 1971 DXMY in Cotabato. In early 1972, station DYCC in Calbayog. By 1972, RMN had fifteen (15) AM stations under its wings.

In 1973, with a constitutional limitation prohibiting the ownership of media by non-Filipinos or corporations not 100% Filipino owned, Henry Canoy's group brought out the Soriano-San Miguel group holdings in RMN.

In 1975, the call letters of the Manila flagship station, DZHP was changed to DWXL. Together with this, English programming gave way to Tagalog. RMN's AM stations were broadcasting in three major languages: Tagalog, Cebuano and Ilonggo. Noted columnist Teodoro Valencia joined RMN as its chairman of the board. Under his guidance RMN was able to secure a loan from the Development Bank of the Philippines to finance its massive expansion and development program. A Cebuano drama production center based in DYHP-Cebu was established and subsequently followed by an Ilonggo drama production center based in DYHB-Bacolod.

In 1978, RMN's major expansion program was launched which include the upgrading of the technical facilities of its existing stations and the establishment of additional AM and FM stations. Among the stations that were added to the roster of RMN stations were: DXMD in General Santos, DWHP-FM in Laoag, DYRR in Ormoc, DXWR-FM in Zamboanga, DXIX-FM in Iligan, DYXY-FM in Tacloban, DYRS in San Carlos, DXVM-FM in Cagayan de Oro, DXMB-AM in Malaybalay, DXXL-FM in Davao, DYXL-FM in Cebu, DWKC-FM in Metro Manila & DXKR-AM in Marbel, South Cotabato. DYKR-AM in Kalibo in 1979. DWHB-FM in Baguio, DWON in Dagupan and DYVR-AM in Roxas opened in 1980. DXDR-AM in Dipolog & DXPR in Pagadian was added on January 10, 1980, DXXX-FM in Butuan in 1985, DYVR-FM in Roxas in 1986 and DYIC-FM in Iloilo City in 1987.

RMN also increased its coverage by entering into tie-up arrangements with smaller networks. Under this scheme, RMN provided programming, marketing, technical and management expertise where these small stations would be found wanting. This gave birth to a new name for these stations under the RMN umbrella - Radio Mindanao Network, Inc. and Associates.

In 1985, the programming of all RMN FM stations were also re-oriented to cater to a younger pop music audience. This was in line with the network's philosophy of positioning to be No.1 in listenership ratings. To give more emphasis to the emerging FM station market, RMN also divided its operations into two Operating Divisions, AM and FM. During the early 90s, DYHP in Cebu was also aired their programs via satellite thru the stations DYHD in Tagbilaran, DYRR in Ormoc, DYWC in Dumaguete, DYRS in San Carlos, DXDR in Dipolog and DXRS in Surigao.

In 1990, RMN undertook another major expansion program which entailed the addition of seven FM radio stations. A permit for RMN's first TV station located in Cagayan de Oro was also granted.

On April 18, 1991, President Corazon Aquino signed into law Republic Act 6980 entitled "An Act Renewing the Franchise Granted to Radio Mindanao Network, Inc. under Republic Act Numbered Thirty-One Hundred Twenty-Two to another Twenty-Five (25) years from the date of approval of this Act". This was the first broadcast franchise approved under President Aquino's term of office.

On August 28, 1991, TV-8, RMN's first television station went on the air in Cagayan de Oro. RMN-TV 8 was then an affiliate of the then newly established Associated Broadcasting Company from 1992 to 1995. Thirty nine years after its start, RMN was now venturing into television. In December 1991, RMN was also granted a permit to operate a UHF television station in Metro Manila (which was led to officially started two years later, on October 31, 1993; the frequency was now used by Broadcast Enterprises and Affiliated Media, Inc. (thru Globe Telecom's then-subsidiary Altimax Broadcasting Company)).

In 1998, it went global by establishing the first Philippine radio station to conquer the United States airwaves through WRMN in New York City.

In June 2007, RMN fm station DWKC 93.9 in Manila was the first commercial station in the country to broadcast with HD Radio technology. It broadcast in three HD Radio digital audio channels along with its pre-existing analog signal. The operation of its facility was in high-level combined hybrid mode with an existing 35 kW analog transmitter, a new Nautel 1 kW HD Radio transmitter, with the digital exciter, importer and exporter providing the digital signal component.

Television
With the acquisition of Radio Mindanao Network by Andrés Soriano, Sr. in 1962, RMN and Inter-Island Broadcasting Corporation (IBC) formed the first tri-media organization in the Philippines along with newspaper, The Philippines Herald. As the television arm of the RMN, IBC partnered with the RMN radio stations for coverages of the general elections of 1969 and 1971.

On February 1, 1975, during the martial law era, due to the constitutional limitation prohibiting the ownership of media by non-Filipinos or corporations not 100% Filipino owned, IBC was sold to Roberto Benedicto, who also owned Kanlaon Broadcasting System (KBS) and the corporate name of IBC was changed to Intercontinental Broadcasting Corporation. IBC was later sequestered by the government after the EDSA Revolution in 1986.

On October 31, 1993, Radio Mindanao Network became the second radio-based network to launch a TV network called Cinema Television (CTV) through its flagship station, DWKC-TV and other regional stations. An all-movie channel, its programming included a presentation of Filipino  and Hollywood movies respectively, and programs from E!, an American cable channel. It is the first UHF stations to be inspired by the format of a cable movie channel. It once clinched a top spot for its TV ratings in all UHF stations in Manila.

However, because of the broadcasting rules assigned by National Telecommunications Commission and the matter that they acquired the broadcast rights from E!, CTV stopped its broadcast in September 2000.

In October 2000, E! and RMN announced its partnership to relaunch CTV into E! Philippines, with its broadcasting extended into 24 hours. But in 2003, it reduced its broadcasts into 6 primetime and late-night hours, from 6:00 PM to 2:30 AM. Some of E!'s programs were brought to the Philippines and remade in a local version, one of which was Wild On! Philippines. On June 1, 2003, RMN decided to cease their operations on TV due to financial constraints and poor television ratings, and somehow to focus only on their 2 radio networks (RMN and iFM). There were several religious groups who had wished to acquire block programming of E! Philippines, but RMN refused to accept their offers.

DWKC-TV and other regional stations were soon acquired by Broadcast Enterprises and Affiliated Media (then under the Canoys until it was sold to the Globe Group in 2009) and resumed its operations in 2011.

In March 2016, president and chairman of RMN, Eric S. Canoy announced its intention to bid for 
the acquisition of the government-sequestered TV network Intercontinental Broadcasting Corporation, as part of the government's efforts to privatize the network.

On May 18, 2016, Philippine President Benigno S. Aquino III signed Republic Act No. 10818 An act renewing the franchise granted to the Radio Mindanao Network, Inc. for another twenty-five (25) years on a term that shall take effect on April 18, 2016.

Programming
RMN broadcasts a number of national programs either through a localized version or via satellite from the network's main studios in Makati. Its flagship rolling newscast, RMN News Nationwide, has morning and noontime editions every Monday through Saturday and a late-afternoon edition on weekdays, and is simulcast on RMN-owned and/or affiliated stations in the Philippines.

Only a handful of nationally branded programs like Unang Radyo, Unang Balita, Straight to the Point and Sentro Serbisyo/Centro Serbisyo are broadcast in their respective local versions with different hosts and in different dialects.

Stations
The following is a list of radio stations owned and affiliated by RMN.

Owned-and-operated stations

RMN Network

iFM Philippines

Affiliated stations

AM stations

* - Also affiliated with the Catholic Media Network

FM stations

WRMN New York

WRMN New York is RMN's own internet radio station. Based in Nutley, New Jersey, it also serves the Filipino-American community in the New York City area.

Chronology of radio stations in Mindanao
The pioneer radio broadcasting station in Mindanao was DXMC-AM founded in 1949 and owned by Guillermo Torres of the University of Mindanao in Davao City. It later became UM Broadcasting Network. DXMC-AM is now the present-day DXWT-FM, which was converted into the FM band since 1988.
The second, DXAW, was established by Alfred James Wills, a retired US Army Signal Corps officer (The DXAW calls were used by the TV station in Davao (which is now known as DXAS-TV Channel 4) owned by ABS-CBN from 1967 to 1972.)  There were four others that operated in Butuan, Surigao, Pagadian and Ozamiz.
DXCC-AM is the 7th legally operating radio station having been founded in 1952.

See also
 TV5 Network
 Catholic Media Network
 Intercontinental Broadcasting Corporation - former sister media company of RMN
 Radio Corporation of the Philippines
 RadioWorld Broadcasting Corporation

References

External links 
 
 Farewell, Dear mentor
 Sir Henry
 President Arroyo lauds late RMN founder

 
Philippine radio networks
Mindanao
Radio stations in the Philippines
Television networks in the Philippines
Mass media companies of the Philippines
Mass media companies established in 1952
Television channels and stations established in 1992
1952 establishments in the Philippines
Companies based in Makati
Privately held companies